The seventh cycle of Australia's Next Top Model began airing on 8 August 2011 on Fox8.

The prizes for this cycle included a modelling contract with Chic Model Management, ending the relationship with Priscilla's Model Management, a A$20,000 cash prize thanks to TRESemmé, a brand new Ford Fiesta, an overseas trip to New York City to meet with NEXT Model Management, and an editorial spread and the cover of Harper's Bazaar Australia.

The winner of the competition was 17-year-old Montana Cox from Melbourne, Victoria. This was the last series of Australia's Next Top Model hosted by Sarah Murdoch, after she left the show some months following the cycle's finale.

Series summary
Twenty semi-finalists were ultimately chosen out of 100 applicants from across Australia, who were selected for a casting in the first week of the competition. Sixteen contestants remained after the second episode, and stayed at their designated house in Sydney during the production between May and August 2011.

Requirements
All contestants had to be aged 16 or over in order to apply for the show. To qualify, all applicants had to be Australian citizens currently living in Australia. Additional requirements stated that a contestant could not have had previous experience as a model in a national campaign within the last five years, and if a contestant was represented by an agent or a manager, she had to terminate that representation prior to the competition.

Auditions
Auditions were held on 24 January in Darwin, 27 January in Melbourne, 28 January in Adelaide, on 30 January in Perth, on 3 and 5 February in Sydney and on 12 February 2011 in Brisbane (delayed from 22 January due to the floods that devastated that city).

Cast

Contestants
(Ages stated are at start of contest)

Judges
 Sarah Murdoch (host)
 Alex Perry
 Charlotte Dawson

Other cast members
 Josh Flinn – style director, model mentor

Episodes

Results

 
 The contestant was eliminated
 The contestant won the competition

Average call-out order
Casting call-out order and final two are not included.

Bottom two

 The contestant was eliminated after her first time in the bottom two/three
 The contestant was eliminated after her second time in the bottom two/three
 The contestant was eliminated in the final judging and placed third
 The contestant was eliminated in the final judging and placed as the runner-up

Controversy
There was some controversy surrounding the show following comments made by Alex Perry regarding the body of one of the contestants. 18-year-old Alissandra Moone from Perth was criticised by Perry, who compared her body to "overstuffed luggage" after seeing one of her photos in the fourth episode of the series. Fans of the show immediately took to social media after the episode aired to express their outrage, to which Perry replied that he had been referring to Moone's posing skills in a confined space, and not her body. The model was ultimately eliminated the following episode, in which she'd been unable to fit into a size 10 dress for a photo shoot and had to have her photo taken as a close-up. During the episode's deliberation, Perry stated that he wasn't looking for "Australia's next top head". Perry went on to explain, "As a model, no matter what environment you're shooting in, you need to be able to make it work, and she didn't. In regards to her elimination, models need to be able to fit into sample size dresses. She was given a standard size 10 dress to wear and could not fit into it."

When questioned over Perry's comments, Moone stated "It's a very bad message to be sending to young girls who watch the show. It's harsh. It's stupid. And it's out of touch. I understand it's a reality of the industry but this is a TV show and they should have a responsibility to censor that kind of thing. I know this has happened to other girls in the past but I was shocked when he said I was too fat. I'm only a size eight. There's going to be a lot of young girls watching this who are bigger than me, and how's this going to make them feel? I understand it's probably a reality of the industry but no one likes to be told they look fat - regardless of what job you are in, I have never thought of myself as fat. I am a health freak. I go to the gym and eat well."

There was also some backfire from animal rights group PETA over the prominent use of animal fur in one of the photo shoots of the series. Foxtel defended the shoot, with a spokeswoman explaining that it had been inspired by Native American culture. The representative stated "It is a trend and idea borrowed from a past culture. Foxtel, ANTM producers, host (Sarah Murdoch) and the judges in no way condone the ongoing practice of producing fashion items using real fur." Prior to this, the show had already met criticism over its use of fur in a shoot for the previous cycle.

Notes

References

External links
 Official website (archive at the Wayback Machine)

2011 Australian television seasons
Australia's Next Top Model seasons
Television shows filmed in Australia
Television shows filmed in France
Television shows filmed in the United Arab Emirates